Greater London is divided into fourteen territorial constituencies for London Assembly elections, each returning one member. The electoral system used is additional member system without an overhang and there are, therefore, a fixed number of eleven additional members elected from a party list.

List of constituencies
As of the 2016 election, the fourteen single-member constituencies are listed below. Each constituency comprises between two and four local authorities, with an average electorate of around 440,000.

Assembly Members

Constituency AMs

Additional Members

By seat

Seats allocated using d'Hondt method, in order. Any party gaining less than 5% of the vote is not eligible for an Additional Assembly Member seat. Transfers within parties between elections omitted for simplicity.

By party representation
N.B.: The columns of this table do not represent actual constituencies.

See also
List of electoral divisions in Greater London
List of electoral wards in Greater London
List of parliamentary constituencies in London

References

External links
 London Assembly constituency information – official GLA site
 Boundary Committee for England (designed the constituencies)

 
Constituencies
Constituencies, London Assembly